The Jesuits, or Society of Jesus, a Roman Catholic religious order, have had a long history of missions in East and South Asia from their very foundation in the 16th century; St. Francis Xavier, a friend of St. Ignatius of Loyola and co-founder of the Society, visited India, the Moluques, Japan and died (1552) as he was attempting to enter China.

See also
Alessandro Valignano
Christianity in China
Christianity in Taiwan
Christianity in India
Christianity and the History of the Catholic Church in Japan
Francis Xavier
Jesuit China missions
Matteo Ricci
Ferdinand Verbiest
Pedro Arrupe
Roberto de Nobili
Thomas Stephens (Jesuit)